John McCann (born 27 July 1934 in Glasgow, Scotland) is a former professional footballer who played as a winger for six English clubs during the 1950s and 1960s.

External links 

1934 births
Living people
Footballers from Glasgow
Scottish footballers
Association football wingers
English Football League players
Barnsley F.C. players
Bristol City F.C. players
Huddersfield Town A.F.C. players
Derby County F.C. players
Darlington F.C. players
Chesterfield F.C. players
Scotland B international footballers